The 1991 Ohio Bobcats football team was an American football team that represented Ohio University in the Mid-American Conference (MAC) during the 1991 NCAA Division I-A football season. In their second season under head coach Tom Lichtenberg, the Bobcats compiled a 2–8–1 record (1–6–1 against MAC opponents), finished in eighth place in the MAC, and were outscored by all opponents by a combined total of 308 to 176.  They played their home games in Peden Stadium in Athens, Ohio.

Schedule

References

Ohio
Ohio Bobcats football seasons
Ohio Bobcats football